František Čermák and Leoš Friedl were the defending champions but lost in the final 6–4, 6–7 (7–9), 6–3 against Mariusz Fyrstenberg and Marcin Matkowski.

Seeds
Champion seeds are indicated in bold text while text in italics indicates the round in which those seeds were eliminated.

 František Čermák /  Leoš Friedl (final)
 Lucas Arnold /  Mariano Hood (semifinals)
 Massimo Bertolini /  Sebastián Prieto (first round)
 Devin Bowen /  Ashley Fisher (first round)

Draw

External links
 2003 Idea Prokom Open Men's Doubles Draw

Men's Doubles
Doubles